Lin-28 homolog B is a protein that in humans is encoded by the LIN28B gene.

Function

The protein encoded by this gene belongs to the lin-28 family, which is characterized by the presence of a cold-shock domain and a pair of CCHC zinc finger domains. This gene is highly expressed in testis, fetal liver, placenta, and in primary human tumors and cancer cell lines. It is negatively regulated by microRNAs that target sites in the 3' UTR, and overexpression of this gene in primary tumors is linked to the repression of let-7 family of microRNAs and derepression of let-7 targets, which facilitates cellular transformation.

References

Further reading 

Genes
Human proteins